Rosemary Sassoon (born 1931 and currently residing in Busselton, Western Australia) is an expert in handwriting, particularly that of children. She designed the Sassoon series of typefaces, produced in collaboration with Adrian Williams, which are intended to be particularly legible for children and learners.

Early life and education
Sassoon was born in the United Kingdom.

Career
In 1988 she earned a Ph.D. from the Department of Typography and Graphic Communication at the University of Reading in Berkshire, England.  Sassoon's personal papers are held in the archives of University of London's Institute of Education.

Published works
The Acquisition of a Second Writing System (Intellect) originally published in 1995, reprinted in 2004.
The Art and Science of Handwriting (Intellect) originally published in 1993, reprinted in 2004.
Computers and Typography 2 (Intellect) Bristol 2003
Creating letterforms : calligraphy and lettering: an introductory guide (Thames & Hudson) with Patricia Lovett. 1992
Handwriting of the Twentieth Century (Routledge)1999
Handwriting: The Way to Teach it (Paul Chapman) 2003  
The Practical Guide to Calligraphy (Thames & Hudson) London 1982, reprinted in 2005
Practical Guide to Children's Handwriting (Hodder & Stoughton) London 1983
The Practical Guide to Lettering (Thames & Hudson) London 1986
Signs Symbols and Icons (with Albertine Gaur) (Intellect) Bristol 1995
Teach Yourself Better Handwriting (Hodder & Stoughton) 2009

List of Sassoon fonts

Sassoon Primary Infant
Sassoon Primary Infant Medium
Sassoon Primary Infant Bold
Sassoon Primary Type
Sassoon Primary Type Medium
Sassoon Primary Type Bold
Sassoon Sans
Sassoon Sans Medium
Sassoon Sans Bold
Sassoon Type Sans
Sassoon Type Sans Medium
Sassoon Type Sans Bold
Sassoon Italic Regular
Sassoon Italic Medium
Sassoon Primary Type Medium Condensed
Sassoon Penned
Sassoon Penned Medium
Sassoon Penned Bold

References

Further reading
 Gerda Breuer and Julia Meer: Women in Graphic Design, Jovis/Berlin 2012, p. 195, 541, 543.

External links
Profile of Sassoon

1931 births
Living people
British Jews